Mecheda is a town in Shahid Matangini Block in West Bengal, India. The town is the entrance point of Purba Medinipur Dist. which lies upon the South Eastern Railway Zone and in proximity to Haldia, Tamluk, Digha and Contai, Egra.

Education
Mecheda has a long history of education. Besides having a number of schools it has a semi-government engineering college, the College Of Engineering & Management, Kolaghat.  The college was conceived and planned by Professor Shankar Sen, an educationist and a former vice chancellor of Jadavpur University, in 1998. It has a campus area of 26.925 acres (108,960 m2) and is located 57 km from Kolkata within the Kolaghat Thermal Power Plant Township, Purba Midnapur, West Bengal. The college offers full-time engineering programmes leading to a 4-year B.Tech degree from West Bengal University of Technology. All the courses are approved by All India Council of Technical Education in New Delhi. However, the college started off in 1998 with affiliation by Vidyasagar University, Midnapore, West Bengal. The first three batches of engineering graduates (1998–2002, 1999–2003 and 2000–2004) received Bachelor of Engineering (B.E.) degree from Vidyasagar University. In 2001 when West Bengal University of Technology was formed, all non-government engineering colleges in West Bengal including the College Of Engineering & Management, Kolaghat came under its roof.

People from all over India are employed here due to the Kolaghat Thermal Power Plant.

Weather
Summers are hot, but the winters are mild with the mercury hardly going below 11 °C.  During the winter, weather is relatively warmer than other places in Purba Medinipur.

Cuisine 
Mecheda is famous for its own popular Mechedar vegetable Chop and potatoes chop. Apart from this, there are few restaurants like Park Point, Sher-e-Bengal, etc.Famous restaurant Sher-e-Punjab is just 3 km away. 2 resorts are there named Regal Guest House and Star Village and a Children Park also.

Communication
Mecheda is the gateway of Purba Medinipur district. NH41, State highway and South Eastern Railways, Kalaikunda is an air force base about 100 km from Mecheda connected by SE railway. NH-6 is just 2 km away. Mecheda acts as a junction point for travellers who are going to Haldia Port. Digha is 110 km from Mecheda. By bus, Haldia is just one hour away from Mecheda Railway station. The Mecheda Railway station is well-connected by buses which come from a long distance. These routes cross through Mecheda station. From Mecheda one can also get buses to Kolkata/Howrah.

Also, trains like the Howrah-Digha Tamralipta Express, Kandari Express, Shalimar-Mumbai LTTR Express, Ahmedabad Express, Jagannath Express, Howrah-Hyderabad East Coast Express stops here for goods exchange, boarding, and alighting.

References

Cities and towns in Purba Medinipur district